Krystian Getinger (born 29 August 1988) is a Polish professional footballer who plays as a left-back for Stal Mielec.

Career

In 2007, Getinger signed for Polish top flight side Zagłębie Lubin after playing for Stal Mielec in the Polish fourth division.

Before the second half of 2008–09, he returned to Polish fourth division club Stal Mielec.

In 2010, he signed for Stal Stalowa Wola in the Polish third division.

In 2013, Getinger returned to Polish third division team Stal Mielec, helping them achieve promotion to the Polish top flight within 7 seasons.

References

External links
 
 

Polish footballers
Ekstraklasa players
I liga players
II liga players
III liga players
Living people
1988 births
People from Mielec
Association football defenders
Zagłębie Lubin players
Stal Mielec players
Stal Stalowa Wola players